Keya Creek is a creek in  northern Taiwan. Keya Creesk is under the jurisdiction of the Central Management District. It was originally known as Xizhi Creek.  The Creek covers Hsinchu County, Baoshan Township and Hsinchu City. Keya Creek starts from Zhudong Hills, then flowing down to the four townships of Shanhu, Baoshan, Daqi, and Shuangxi, then enters into Hsinchu City's Green Grass Lake, Hsinchu plains, then out into  Taiwan Strait.

History
Historically, Hsinchu's rice noodles were produced along Keya Creek, the noodle makers would set out basket for them to dry along the creek.

References

Rivers of Taiwan
Landforms of Hsinchu County